Magdayao may refer to:

Shaina Magdayao (born 1989), Filipino actress
Sharon Magdayao, birth name of Vina Morales (born 1975), Filipino actress and singer